ATV Offroad Fury 4 is a racing video game developed by Climax Racing and published by Sony Computer Entertainment for PlayStation 2.

Gameplay
ATV Offroad Fury 4 sees the introduction of new vehicles such as dirt bikes, trophy trucks and dune buggies, alongside existing quad bikes; this allows the game to include up to 50 Championship Modes. In addition to improved graphics, it also has an additional 60 tracks and improved online gaming.

In terms of in-game controls, more tricks are possible while the player is on an MX motorcycle, but none can be performed while the player is controlling a Trophy Truck or Dune Buggy. Similar to the risk of being thrown off an ATV or motorcycle during the game, Trophy Trucks and Dune Buggies are vulnerable to rollovers, after which the player's vehicle will be automatically reset back on its wheels, as it is when thrown off of an ATV or motorcycle. The game also offers tutorials on how to drive Trophy Trucks and Dune Buggies.

Similar to NASCAR Thunder 2004 is the introduction of rivals. All opponents have an icon above them; when a player hits an opponent, the opponent's icon will turn red and the opponent will be more aggressive towards the player.

The game has a "Story Mode" where players compete in events around the world and are required to complete a certain number of events to move on.

ATV Offroad Fury 4 includes more mini-games, such as "Ice Hockey" (introduced in ATV Offroad Fury 2), "Scavenger Hunt", "King Of The Hill", "Bowling", and "Ring of Fire".

PSP version

A loose adaptation for the PlayStation Portable was released at the same time titled ATV Offroad Fury Pro. This game uses the same physics engine and offers the same vehicles as 4, but features completely different race tracks, some exclusive vehicles, mini-games, and soundtrack. It features both ad hoc (local area network) or Infrastructure (web) multiplayer modes. This game also includes new vehicle classes known as snowmobiles and rally cars, which are exclusive to this game.

Eight "Classic" tracks can be unlocked by synchronizing own Save File with an ATV Offroad Fury Pro save via USB Link with a PlayStation Portable. These tracks appear in previous games in the series, and must be unlocked through Pro before unlocking them in 4.

Reception

ATV Offroad Fury 4 received "generally positive" reviews, according to review aggregator Metacritic.

References

External links

2006 video games
ATV Offroad Fury
Multiplayer and single-player video games
MX vs. ATV
PlayStation 2 games
PlayStation Portable games
Racing video games
Sony Interactive Entertainment games
Video games developed in the United Kingdom